Nguyễn Hữu Việt (1 October 1988 – 25 March 2022) was a Vietnamese swimmer who specialized in breaststroke events. He won a total of five medals (three golds, one silver, and one bronze), and set numerous records for both the 100 and 200 m breaststroke at the Southeast Asian Games (2003–2009). 

Nguyễn made his first Vietnamese Olympic team as a 15-year-old for the 2004 Summer Olympics in Athens, where he competed in the men's 100 m breaststroke. Swimming in heat three, he rounded out a field of seven swimmers to place last and fifty-second overall by two thirds of a second (0.66) behind Estonia's Aleksander Baldin, with a time of 1:06.70.

At the 2008 Summer Olympics in Beijing, Nguyễn qualified again for the second time in the 100 m breaststroke. He received a FINA wild card entry by achieving his personal best of 1:03.73 from his gold medal triumph at the 2007 Southeast Asian Games in Bangkok, Thailand.  Nguyễn challenged five other swimmers in heat two, including fellow two-time Olympian Sergiu Postică of Moldova. He raced to fourth place by 0.14 of a second behind Lebanon's Wael Koubrousli in 1:06.36. Nguyễn failed to advance into the semifinals, as he placed fifty-eighth overall on the first night of the preliminaries.

References

External links
 
NBC Olympics Profile

1988 births
2022 deaths
Vietnamese male swimmers
Olympic swimmers of Vietnam
Swimmers at the 2004 Summer Olympics
Swimmers at the 2008 Summer Olympics
Swimmers at the 2006 Asian Games
Swimmers at the 2010 Asian Games
Male breaststroke swimmers
People from Haiphong
Southeast Asian Games medalists in swimming
Southeast Asian Games gold medalists for Vietnam
Southeast Asian Games silver medalists for Vietnam
Southeast Asian Games bronze medalists for Vietnam
Competitors at the 2005 Southeast Asian Games
Competitors at the 2003 Southeast Asian Games
Competitors at the 2007 Southeast Asian Games
Competitors at the 2009 Southeast Asian Games
Asian Games competitors for Vietnam
Deaths from asthma
20th-century Vietnamese people
21st-century Vietnamese people